was a Japanese politician of the Liberal Democratic Party, a member of the House of Representatives in the Diet (national legislature). A native of Satte, Saitama and graduate of Saitama Medical School, he was elected to the House of Representatives for the first time in 2000.

References 
 
 Obituary (in Japanese)

External links 
  

1953 births
2010 deaths
Politicians from Saitama Prefecture
20th-century Japanese physicians
Members of the House of Representatives (Japan)
Liberal Democratic Party (Japan) politicians
21st-century Japanese politicians